Foothills Medical Centre (FMC) is the largest hospital in the province of Alberta and is located in the city of Calgary. It is one of Canada's most recognized medical facilities and one of the leading research and teaching hospitals. Foothills Medical Centre provides advanced healthcare services to over two million people from Calgary, and surrounding regions including southern Alberta, southeastern British Columbia, and southern Saskatchewan. Formerly operated by the Calgary Health Region, it is now under the authority of Alberta Health Services and part of the University of Calgary Medical Centre.

The main building of the hospital was opened in June 1966. It was originally named Foothills Provincial General Hospital and later known simply as Foothills Hospital. With the addition of other medical facilities, it became known by its present name.

Information

Foothills Medical Centre is an accredited Level 1 trauma centre by the Trauma Association of Canada, one of 10 trauma centres in Alberta, and the largest regional trauma centre in Southern Alberta. In addition, Foothills Medical Centre is accredited by Accreditation Canada for stroke rehabilitation. Foothills Medical Centre works in conjunction with the nearby University of Calgary for the purposes of educating students as well as providing facilities for medical research.

FMC includes the University of Calgary Cumming School of Medicine, Hotchkiss Brain Institute, as well as the Special Services Building (where most other medical services are provided) and the Tom Baker Cancer Centre, which was renamed the "Cancer Centre", and is a leading centre in Alberta for cancer treatment and research. The large site also features Grace Women's Health Centre, which specializes in women's health, the Health Sciences Association of Alberta, as well as both the North Tower and South Tower, which offer many outpatient services. The head office of Libin Cardiovascular Institute of Alberta is located on the 8th floor of the Foothills Medical Centre. The TRW Building was also added to the Health Sciences building, which was completed in late 2005. In addition, the new McCaig Tower opened in October 2010 with 93 inpatient beds, 36 bed intensive care unit (only 28 funded by the Government of Alberta), 21 short-stay beds (a total of 150 additional beds), as well as 8 operating rooms. In November 2011, the newly designed Intensive Care Unit (ICU) was awarded the 2012 Design Citation for being "one of the best in the world". The neighbouring Alberta Children's Hospital and west side of the University of Calgary campus are accessible from FMC via West Campus Boulevard.

Apart from these distinctions, FMC boasts the world's first and most powerful movable MRI machine, which was introduced in January 2009. It will help patients at the Foothills Medical Centre (FMC) receive the world's safest, most accurate surgery possible. In addition, the world's first robotic surgery to remove a brain tumour was performed on a patient at the FMC, which also created a landmark in Canadian medical history. In June 2010, the Calgary Stroke Program, an initiative of the Foothills Medical Centre, was awarded the "Stroke Services Distinction" and is recognized as one of two leading stroke centres in Canada, the other in Toronto, by Accreditation Canada.

Alberta Health Services
The Foothills Medical Centre is one of twelve hospitals in the Calgary zone, which has a population of 1,408,606 and an average life expectancy of 82.9 years.

Current description
In addition to a 24-hour emergency room and inpatient care, FMC has 57 outpatient clinics on site. This facility provides comprehensive and specialized medical and surgical services to Calgary and Southern Alberta:

 33 bed intensive care unit and 24 bed cardiac intensive care unit
 Level 1 Trauma centre for Southern Alberta
 8 bed burn unit
 28 operating theatres - including a specially designated trauma operating room
 High risk maternity and neonatal intensive care unit
 PARTY Program (Prevent Alcohol & Risk Related Trauma in Youth Program for Grade 9 secondary school students)
 PADIS (poison & drug information)
 Southern Alberta Renal Program
 Intraoperative MR - magnetic resonance system (first of its kind in the world, located in the Seaman's Family MR Research Centre)
 Stephenson Cardiac MR Centre - the leading cardiac magnetic resonance facility in Canada, as measured by number of peer-reviewed articles published, and part of the Libin Cardiovascular Institute of Alberta
 Multiple transplantation such as kidney, pancreas, corneal and tissue transplants
 HOPE Program (Human Organ Procurement and Exchange)
 University of Calgary Medical Clinic (UCMC) clinics
 The Colon Cancer Screening Centre - providing screening colonoscopies to hundreds of patients a month

Chronology of hospital projects

1958
 Provincial and territorial hospital insurance plans. The Prime Minister of Canada, John Diefenbaker, declares federal grants are available to provincial hospital-care projects, 50 cents on the dollar financing, from Ottawa.

1965
 Main building completed, Foothills Hospital.
 First school of nursing class begins study.

1966
 February, main Hospital Phase II complete.
 April, first out-patients and glaucoma laboratory.
 June, Foothills Hospital opens.

During opening year, "Patient Care" booklet describes new hospital:
"Largest completely new hospital of its kind constructed in North America;  of floor space; 2,000 rooms. Patient capacity: 766 beds, 116 bassinettes, 15 day care beds. Staff when the hospital is in full operation: 1,200-1,500. Cost: $21,000,000 for construction of hospital, School of Nursing and Power Plant — $5,000,000 for initial equipment. T-shaped hospital building, 12 storeys plus basement. The cross-piece of the T includes all nursing units. The back wing, or stem of the T, is 10 storeys high and includes all clinical and other service departments. A 100 bed auxiliary hospital is planned for later construction on site; also a 370 bed psychiatric hospital which will be operated under separate administration. Capital financing for construction was by the usual Federal Provincial grants plus a $17 million debenture issue to be retired by the Provincial Government over a 20-year period. Operation costs will be met by the standard per diem payments made under Alberta Hospitalization Benefits. Complete hospital control is vested in the board of Management."
Pathology labs (medical laboratory) begins using advanced equipment to provide a complete pathology service.
Residence for 329 nursing students is linked as teaching hospital support of Foothills Hospital.
Planning continues for 100-bed auxiliary hospital and 370 beds for psychiatric patients.
1966 to 2007 and beyond
Hospital expands, largest hospital of the province of Alberta to be Foothills Medical Centre.

2001
November, new 14-bed inpatient stroke unit, Unit 100.

2006
October 19, as part of a C$1.7 billion expansion for Foothills Medical Centre the Calgary Health Region named the new tower the JR (Bud) McCaig Tower after well-known local philanthropist, Bud McCaig. McCaig who had died in 2005 was the founder of Alberta Bone & Joint Health Institute.

2010
C$460M 8-storey tower, JR (Bud) McCaig Tower.
JR (Bud) McCaig Tower adds to largest hospital of province Alberta:
8 operating rooms
36-bed intensive care unit (only 26 beds funded)
93 inpatient beds
21 short-stay beds
Diagnostic imaging
Southern Alberta Tissue Program
Calgary Laboratory Services
space for expansion (16 operating rooms)
Expanded and renovated emergency department (main building)
Musculoskeletal (MSK) Clinic
Bone and Joint Program includes MSK Clinic, surgery, and teaching facilities
Surgical processing
Admitting

2017 (2023)
C$1.4B Calgary Cancer Centre.
Construction begins to add new building to largest hospital in Alberta:
160 inpatient beds
12 radiation vaults
100 patient exam rooms
100 chemotherapy chairs
1,650 underground parking spaces
984-linear feet of elevated walkway

Parking
The Foothills Medical Centre has eleven parking lots with payment options including passes: monthly ($71), weekly ($40), daily ($14.25) or half-hour ($2 per half-hour or portion) with some discounts for seniors, etc., with authorization forms. A general monthly pass with no authorization form costs $125 if available. Some parking lots/stalls are designated for people with disabilities only.

In popular culture
The Foothills Medical Centre is alluded to in the Tragically Hip song "Take Forever" from the album Now for Plan A. The song's lyrics "Calgary, to have my heart attack; Calgary, the place to do it, it's a fact" reference to the angioplasty treatment available at the hospital and a 2010 study completed by University of Calgary researchers.

See also
Health care in Calgary
List of hospitals in Canada

References

Sources

The University of Calgary - Archives

External links

Foothills Medical Centre

Hospital buildings completed in 1965
Buildings and structures in Calgary
Hospitals in Calgary
Hospitals established in 1966
Heliports in Canada
Certified airports in Alberta